The 2018–19 LigaPro (also known as Ledman LigaPro for sponsorship reasons) was the 29th season of Portuguese football's second-tier league, and the fifth season under the current LigaPro title. A total of 18 teams competed in this division, including reserve sides from top-flight Primeira Liga teams.

Teams
A total of 18 teams contested the league, including 14 sides from the 2017–18 season, 2 teams relegated from the 2017–18 Primeira Liga and 2 promoted from the 2017–18 Campeonato de Portugal.

Team changes

Relegated from 2017–18 Primeira Liga
Paços de Ferreira
Estoril

Promoted from 2017–18 Campeonato de Portugal
Farense
Mafra

Promoted to 2018–19 Primeira Liga
Nacional
Santa Clara

Relegated to 2018–19 Campeonato de Portugal
União da Madeira
Sporting CP B
Gil Vicente
Real

Stadium and locations

Personnel and sponsors

Coaching changes

Season summary

League table

References 

Liga Portugal 2 seasons
2018–19 in Portuguese football leagues
Portugal